The 2018–19 Kansas Jayhawks men's basketball team  represented the University of Kansas in the 2018–19 NCAA Division I men's basketball season, which was the Jayhawks' 121st basketball season. The Jayhawks, members of the Big 12 Conference, played their home games at Allen Fieldhouse in Lawrence, Kansas. They were led by 16th year Hall of Fame head coach Bill Self.

Season notes
The Jayhawks entered the season with high expectations due to returning All-Big 12 players Udoka Azubuike and LaGerald Vick, adding three 2018 McDonald's All-Americans, and several transfers coming off their redshirt years. Following the 2017–18 season, several sports websites ranked Kansas 1st on their "Way too early rankings" which preview the next season. The Jayhawks also entered the season ranked number 1 in the AP Poll. Despite the high expectations, the team dealt with adversity during the season as four different players that were expected to be starters missed time. Silvio De Sousa was declared ineligible by the NCAA, Udoka Azubuike underwent season ending surgery in January, Marcus Garrett missed five games due to injury, and LaGerald Vick took a leave absence in February to handle personal issues and eventually announced he wouldn't return. On February 23, 2019, the Jayhawks lost to Texas Tech 62-91. The loss was the Jayhawks worst conference loss under Bill Self and worst conference loss since the 1999-2000 season when they lost to Oklahoma State 53-86. Following a 68–81 loss to Oklahoma on March 5, the Jayhawks were eliminated from Big 12 regular season title contention, ending their NCAA record streak of 14 consecutive titles.

Roster and coaching staff changes

Graduation
Below are players who graduated from the University of Kansas without any college eligibility left.

Early draft entrants

Hired agent
Players that hire an agent after declaring for the NBA draft automatically forfeit any remaining college eligibility. Below are any players that declared for the draft and hired an agent and will not be returning.

Did not hire agent
Players who do not hire an agent can return to their college as long as they withdraw from the draft no more than 10 days after the final day of the NBA draft Combine, which made May 31 the final date to withdraw from the 2018 Draft. The following players entered the draft without initially hiring an agent. Also included is their final decision to either return to Kansas or if they hired an agent and stayed in the draft.

Transfers

Outgoing

Left team for other reasons

Left team during season

Incoming freshmen

Recruiting class

|-
| colspan="7" style="padding-left:10px;" | Overall recruiting rankings:     Scout: 5     Rivals: 5       ESPN: 6 
|}

Walk–ons

Roster

Schedule and results

|-
!colspan=12 style=| Exhibition

|-
!colspan=12 style=| Regular Season

|-
!colspan=12 style=| Big 12 Tournament

|-
!colspan=12 style=""|

Rankings

References

Kansas Jayhawks men's basketball seasons
Kansas Jayhawks
2018 in Kansas
Kansas